Eli Jaxon-Bear (born Elliot Jay Zeldow, 1947) is an American spiritual teacher and author. He lives in Ashland, Oregon, with his wife and spiritual teacher Gangaji. Before he met his teacher, Sri H.W.L. Poonja, in 1990, Jaxon-Bear was best known for his work on the spiritual dimension of the Enneagram. Following his meeting with Poonjaji he continued to teach, carrying his teacher's message of spiritual liberation to the West.

Early life
Jaxon-Bear was born in Brooklyn, New York in 1947. In 1965 he was part of a group of students who went to Montgomery, Alabama, to take part in the civil rights marches. Later he wrote of this experience, "Getting on the bus represented a much deeper commitment than simply enduring a few weeks of dangerous adventure. Finally, I had to give my life fully to getting on the bus for freedom without a thought of getting off." 
He graduated in 1968 from the University of Pittsburgh and became a community organizer in Chicago and Detroit. He was arrested during the Democratic Convention in the summer of 1968. Freedom of Information documents show that the FBI began a file on Jaxon-Bear after his arrest. After six months of working in a steel mill in Homestead, Pennsylvania, he was awarded a fellowship for a doctorate at the Graduate School for International Studies at the University of Denver. He was part of the student strike committee that shut down the university in 1970.

Spiritual path
Jaxon-Bear's eighteen-year spiritual path began after the 1971 May Day Protests, when he became a federal fugitive during the Vietnam War. In his own words, an awakening experience  led him on a spiritual search that took him around the world and into many traditions and practices. In 1978, Kalu Rinpoche appointed him the president of Kagyu Minjur Choling, the first Kagyu Tibetan Buddhist dharma center in Marin County. In 1982, he was presented with a Zen teaching fan at Cho Sho-ji Zen Temple in Beppu, Japan. Through the 1980s, Jaxon-Bear ran a clinical hypnosis and neurolinguistics certification program at the Esalen Institute. Also during that time, he studied the wisdom teachings of the Enneagram. His first writings and teachings on the Enneagram emerged in 1989. He was a keynote speaker at the first International Enneagram Conference at Stanford University in August 1994. His talk was entitled "The Enneagram and Self-Realization".

In 1990 in India, Jaxon-Bear met the spiritual teacher Sri H.W.L. Poonja, called "Papaji" by his followers. A few months later, he took his wife, Antoinette Varner, to meet Papaji. She too became a devotee and Papaji named her Gangaji.  Subsequent to the meeting with Papaji, both Jaxon-Bear and Gangaji were allowed to teach satsang in the West, and given conditional permission to publish Wake Up and Roar. A full account of Jaxon-Bear's early life and spiritual path until he met his teacher Papaji, can be found in his detailed memoir, An Outlaw Makes it Home: The Awakening of a Spiritual Revolutionary (2018).

Leela Foundation
Jaxon-Bear established the Leela Foundation, a 501(c)(3) non-profit organization. The organization offers events, books, videos, audios, and outreach programs dedicated to world peace and freedom through universal self-realization. Jaxon-Bear holds public meetings and retreats in the US, Europe and Australia.

Leela School 
Jaxon-Bear is also principal teacher at the Leela School of Awakening, which was established in 2016 as a separate educational non-profit organization. The Leela School offers a A.C.H.E. accredited training and certification in therapeutic intervention and hypnotherapy, with branches in Ashland, Oregon, Sydney, Australia and Amsterdam, The Netherlands.

Bibliography

Books
The Awakened Guide: A Manual for Leaders, Teachers, Coaches, Healers and Helpers (2019),
An Outlaw Makes it Home: The Awakening of a Spiritual Revolutionary (2018),
Wake Up and Roar: Satsang with Papaji, (2017),
From Fixation to Freedom: The Enneagram of Liberation (2006),
 Sudden Awakening Into Direct Realization (2004),
 Wake Up and Roar: Satsang with H.W.L. Poonja, Editor (2002),
 Healing the Heart of Suffering: Using The Enneagram for Spiritual Growth (1989)  (Droemer Knauer, Germany.)
 Flame of Freedom, (1998) Luchow Press, Germany

Articles
 Connections Magazine (May, 2010), "I Love, Therefore I AM"
 KGS Magazine, Hamburg (2008), "Saints, Sinners and Self Realization"
 NOVA Magazine, Australia (August, 2005), "Mirror, Mirror"
 Sein Magazine, Germany (2005), "Interview with Jaxon-Bear"
 Pathways Magazine (April, 2004) "The Awakening Power of Two Simple Questions" (with Gangaji)
 Visionen Magazine (March, 2004), "Meditation"
 Connections Magazine (2004), "Therapy and Spirituality"
 Connections Magazine (April, 2003), "Uncovering Self-Betrayal" (with Gangaji)
 Wegweiser Magazine (June/July, 2003), "Questions on the Roots of War"
 Advaita Journal, Germany, (December, 2003), "The Essence of Evil"
 Sein Magazine, Germany (2003), "Being a True Friend: Putting Relationships in Service of Truth"
 Visionen Magazine (August, 2002), "Commitment to Truth – Do I Want to Be True or To Be Right?"
 KGS Magazine (2002), "What Do You Really Want?"
 Wegweiser Magazine (September, 2001), "New York Report"
 Connections Magazine (May, 2001), "Interview with Jaxon-Bear"
 Recto-Veseau Magazine, Switzerland (March, 1999), "Interview with Jaxon-Bear"
 Connections Magazine (1997), "Interview with Jaxon-Bear"
 Gnosis Magazine (1996), "Preserving the Transmission and Spiritual Context of the Enneagram" (Letter)
 Enneagram Monthly (1995), "Journey to the Land Down Under"
 Enneagram Monthly (1995), "The Enneagram and the Silent Tradition"
 Enneagram Monthly (1995), "Eights: The Outlaw Mentality"
 Enneagram Monthly (1995), "The Soul of the Six"
 Enneagram Monthly (1994), "The Enneagram of Character Fixation"

Audio and video
 An Outlaw Makes it Home: The Awakening of a Spiritual Revolutionary (2019), ASIN: B07NF9LK8W
Wake Up and Roar, Audiobook, 2017, ASIN: B01N34Y4J9
From Fixation to Freedom, CD, 2008, 
 Self Realization and The Enneagram, DVD, 2005, ASIN B000B5KX10
 Living Freedom, DVD, 2005, ASIN: B000A36K8I
 Space for it All, DVD, 2005, ASIN: B000A36K8S
 Trust of Your Nature, DVD, 2005, ASIN: B000B5KX0G
 Chasing the Smoke, DVD, 2005, ASIN: B000B5KX0Q
 Staying True, DVD, 2005, ASIN: B000B5KX06
 Seeds of Awakening, DVD, 2005, ASIN: B0009XBR0K
 Way of the Bodhisattva, VHS, 2000, ASNI: 1893840093
 Interview with David Freudberg: Humankind/NPR Radio

References

External links

 Leela Foundation

Living people
American spiritual teachers
American spiritual writers
New Age spiritual leaders
Writers from Ashland, Oregon
20th-century mystics
Religious leaders from Oregon
Religion in the Pacific Northwest
Neo-Advaita teachers
People with multiple myeloma
1947 births